The Chemins de fer du Jura is a railway company in the canton of Jura in northwestern Switzerland. It was formed in 1944 from the merger of four independent companies connecting Porrentruy to Bonfol, Saignelégier to La Chaux-de-Fonds, Glovelier to Saignelégier and Tavannes to Tramelan and Le Noirmont. The  line from Porrentruy to Bonfol is standard gauge. The company also operates local bus services in the area.

History 
The first company to open a line in the region was the Chemin de fer Tavannes-Tramelan, which opened the  gauge line linking the villages in its name in 1884. This line was extended by the Chemin de fer Tramelan-Les Breuleux-Le Noirmont to reach Le Noirmont and the whole was electrified in 1913.
 
On 7 December 1892 the longest of the region's lines, the Chemin de fer Saignelégier-La Chaux-de-Fonds (SC) was opened linking the places in its title. The  line ran from Saignelégier (Place d'Armes) to La Chaux-de-Fonds, the final kilometre being laid along the streets to the town centre.

The  gauge Porrentruy–Bonfol railway line and Saignelégier–Glovelier railway were opened in 1901 and 1904 respectively. Finally, Porrentruy–Bonfol was extended to Pfetterhouse in 1910. This extension was closed in 1970. The line between Saignelégier and Glovelier  relaid to metre gauge in 1953.
 
Following the amalgamation of the companies in 1943, the rail system was restructured between 1946 and 1953. The complete system was electrified, some 40 years after the first electric trains had run.

Notes

References

External links 

CJ
Railway companies established in 1944
Swiss companies established in 1944